Élodie Ramos (born 13 March 1983, in Aix en Provence) is a French football player currently playing for Montpellier HSC of the Division 1 Féminine. Ramos plays as a striker and is currently one of the longest-serving players at the club, whom she joined in 2002.

Career
Ramos began her career at her hometown club USM Meyreuil in the commune of Meyreuil. After spending nine years at the club, she moved to nearby Marseille joining Celtic Marseille. After spending a few years in the club's youth system, she played one season on the senior team before moving north to the Alsace region joining SC Schiltigheim. In her only season with Schiltigheim, she scored 13 goals.  Following a successful season, Ramos joined Montpellier.  With Montpellier, she became an instant hit becoming one of the club's most decorated players having won the D1 Féminine on two occasions (2004 and 2005), as well as the Challenge de France in 2009. In her eight seasons with Montpellier, Ramos has scored double-digit goals in six and has only collected three yellow cards.

International career
Ramos made her international debut on 22 February 2002 against China. She scored her only international goal to date on 14 March 2007 in a 1–3 loss to Sweden at the Algarve Cup.

References

External links
 
 

1983 births
Living people
French women's footballers
Montpellier HSC (women) players
France women's international footballers
Sportspeople from Aix-en-Provence
French people of Spanish descent
Division 1 Féminine players
Women's association football forwards
Footballers from Provence-Alpes-Côte d'Azur